Konstantinos Papastavrou (Greek: Κωνσταντίνος Παπασταύρου), known with the nickname Mavromatis (Μαυρομάτης, "Black-eye") was a Greek chieftain of the Macedonian Struggle.

Biography 

Papastavrou was born in the 1880s in Mavrovo (now Mavrochori) in Kastoria. Because of his characteristic eyes, he received the nickname "Mavromatis" meaning "Black-eyed".

Armed action 
He set up his own armed group, consisting of local Greeks of Mavrovo and other villages nearby and acted in the regions of Kastoria, Eordaia and Amyntaio during throughout the Macedonian Struggle against Bulgarian komitadjis and specific Ottoman targets. His body consisted of around 45 men. 

He collaborated with chieftains Alexandros Georgiadis and Stergios Kountouras on several occasions.

Sources 
 Ιωάννης Σ. Κολιόπουλος (editor), Αφανείς, γηγενείς Μακεδονομάχοι, Εταιρεία Μακεδονικών Σπουδών, University Studio Press, Thessaloniki, 2008, p. 81, 101
 Χαροκόπειο Πανεπιστήμιο Αθηνών, Τμήμα Οικιακής Οικονομίας και Οικολογίας, Πτυχιακή Μελέτη: Η παραδοσιακή οικογένεια και η παραδοσιακή οικιακή οικονομία στο νομό Καστοριάς, το Μαυροχώρι, Σοφία Σπυροπούλου, Athens 2005

Greek people of the Macedonian Struggle
Greek Macedonians
Macedonian revolutionaries (Greek)
1880s births

Year of birth uncertain
Year of death missing
People from Kastoria (regional unit)